V. I. P. is a 1997 Indian Tamil-language romantic comedy film directed and co-written by Sabapathy Dekshinamurthy. The film stars Prabhu Deva, Abbas, Simran and Rambha, while Rami Reddy, Anupam Kher and Manivannan play other pivotal roles. Ranjit Barot composed the music, while Arthur A. Wilson handled the cinematography. The film was released on 4 July 1997. This is one of the first two Tamil films of actress Simran, along with Once More.

Plot 
Guru is a graduate but cannot find a job because employers are looking for experience. He and his pickpocket and bike thief friend Indhu live along with the mechanic Nizam Bhai and his wife. The couple is a Muslim, and the lady wears a purdah, and it is shown that whoever lifts her purdah and sees her face faints immediately. Nizam Bhai himself has seen his wife's face only during their first night. This provides comic relief.

There is a wealthy businessman, but his business is about to topple when he invites his nephew Santhosh from America to save it from loss. Priya is his daughter, and she expects to marry Santhosh when he arrives. Meanwhile, Guru steals a car from a businessman who refused to employ him and when the goondas chase, he and Indhu enter into the airport. In a series of comic events, Guru ends up in Priya's house as Santhosh, and Santhosh, who tries to save Indhu, lands up with her in  Mizoram.

The businessman introduces Guru (now Santhosh) as the new managing director of the company to his employees. He also encourages Santhosh to take up the new assignment. Guru, who is a talented youth, works hard and brings the company back to business; meanwhile, the real Santhosh struggles with Indhu to get back home. When Santhosh gets back to Chennai, he collects his bags and passport from the airport.

By now, Santhosh has fallen in love with Indhu, and Priya has fallen in love with Guru. Indhu and Guru meet up and find out about Guru acting as Santhosh and that the real Santhosh is with Indhu. When Santhosh finds out that Guru has taken the company to greater heights than he would have, he accepts Guru as his friend and does not reveal his true identity to his uncle's family. In the end, all confusions are cleared, and the lovers unite.

Cast 

Prabhu Deva as Guru
Abbas as Santhosh
Simran as Priya
Rambha as Indhu
Manivannan as Nizam Bhai
Anu Mohan as Rangasamy
Rami Reddy as James
Anupam Kher as Priya's father
Fathima Babu as Priya's mother
Thideer Kannaiah as Thief
Joker Thulasi as Thief
Loose Mohan as Thief
Oru Viral Krishna Rao as Fake swami
Azhagu as James' henchman
Vichu Viswanath as James' henchman
S. S. Chandran as Nair (guest appearance)
Prakash Raj as Santhosh's brother (guest appearance)

Production 

Pooja Kumar was the first choice for a lead actress role, but walked out of the project due to date issues. Producer Thanu then approached Laila, who was left unimpressed when the producer asked her to consider changing her stage name to Pooja, as the invitations for the film had already been printed. Laila also revealed her unawareness of Rambha also being a part of the film. Laila subsequently dropped out of the project, wanting to make her Tamil debut in a film where she played the sole heroine.

The film consequently marked the debut of actress Simran in Tamil films, with V.I.P and her other film, Once More both releasing on 4 July 1997. Simran had earlier rejected Tamil films including Bharathiraja's proposed Siragugal Murivathillai, and had garnered popularity in the Tamil film industry prior to the release of her first film. She worked on V.I.P alongside her commitments for Once More, Nerrukku Ner (1997) and Poochudava (1997). The project also became the first Indian film to have a trailer released online.

Soundtrack 
The music was composed by Ranjit Barot, with lyrics written by Vairamuthu, Arivumathi and Palani Bharathi. Thanu in an interview for Maalai Malar in 2013 revealed that both Ranjit Barot and Shankar Mahadevan were initially chosen as composers; however Shankar left the film due to creative differences but tuned two songs "Minnal Oru Kodi" and "Netru No No".

Release and reception 
V. I. P. was released on 4 July 1997. The film did above average business but ended up being a success at the box office, owing to the substantial size of the budget. Thirumalai Balaji of Indolink described the film as "probably the feel good movie of the year thus far", adding that "this movie is important as its probably the coming of age for Prabhu Deva. He has definitely matured since his Kadhalan days and shows a lot more restraint and a little flair for comedy. Thankfully, not much is required from Abbas or Simran in the acting department." R.P.R. of Kalki wrote that the team have carefully planned to give a film that is completely fun without pain. There will be no cheating in the yield.

References

External links 
 

1990s Tamil-language films
1997 films
1997 romantic comedy films
Films directed by Sabapathy Dekshinamurthy
Films scored by Ranjit Barot
Indian romantic comedy films